Rita was an album released in 2005  by Portuguese singer Rita Guerra and was sung in Portuguese This album was a great success in Portugal and was awarded several platinum discs.

Track listing
 À espera do sol - Waiting for the sun
 Chegar a ti - Reaching you
 Diz-me que o tempo não passa - Tell me that time is not running
 Deixa-me sonhar (só mais uma vez) - Let me dream (just one more time), was the Portuguese entry in the Eurovision Song Contest 2003, in Riga.
 O que tu és para mim - What you are to me
 Se eu pudesse - If I could
 Para além da noite - Beyond the night
 Será - It will be
 Onde tu estiveres - Wherever you are
 Só tu - Only you
 Secretamente - Secretly

References 
2005 albums
Rita Guerra albums